SHB may refer to:

SHB (gene)
Shabab El-Bourj SC, a Lebanese association football club
Nakashibetsu Airport, Japan, IATA code
Shook, Hardy & Bacon, an American law firm
System Host Board
Shepherd's Bush tube station, London, UK, station code

See also
SHB Đà Nẵng F.C., a Vietnamese association football club